A proximity sensor is a sensor able to detect the presence of nearby objects without any physical contact.

A proximity sensor often emits an electromagnetic field or a beam of electromagnetic radiation (infrared, for instance), and looks for changes in the field or return signal. The object being sensed is often referred to as the proximity sensor's target. Different proximity sensor targets demand different sensors. For example, a capacitive proximity sensor or photoelectric sensor might be suitable for a plastic target; an inductive proximity sensor always requires a metal target.

Proximity sensors can have a high reliability and long functional life because of the absence of mechanical parts and lack of physical contact between the sensor and the sensed object.

Proximity sensors are also used in machine vibration monitoring to measure the variation in distance between a shaft and its support bearing. This is common in large steam turbines, compressors, and motors that use sleeve-type bearings.

A proximity sensor adjusted to a very short range is often used as a touch switch.

Use with smartphones and tablet computers 
Proximity sensors are commonly used on mobile devices. When the target is within nominal range, the device lock screen user interface will appear, thus emerging from what is known as sleep mode. Once the device has awoken from sleep mode, if the proximity sensor's target is still for an extended period of time, the sensor will then ignore it, and the device will eventually revert into sleep mode. For example, during a telephone call, proximity sensors play a role in detecting (and skipping) accidental touchscreen taps when mobiles are held to the ear.

Proximity sensors can be used to recognise air gestures and hover-manipulations. An array of proximity sensing elements can replace vision-camera or depth camera based solutions for hand gesture detection.

Types of sensors 
 Capacitive
 Capacitive displacement sensor
 Doppler effect (sensor based on doppler effect)
 Inductive
 Magnetic, including magnetic proximity fuse
 Optical
 Photoelectric
 Photocell (reflective)
 Laser rangefinder
 Passive (such as charge-coupled devices)
 Passive thermal infrared
 Radar
 Reflection of ionizing radiation
 Sonar (typically active or passive)
 Ultrasonic sensor
 Fiber optics sensor
 Hall effect sensor

Applications 

 Parking sensors, systems mounted on car bumpers that sense distance to nearby cars for parking
 Inductive sensors
 Ground proximity warning system for aviation safety
 Vibration measurements of rotating shafts in machinery
 Top dead centre (TDC)/camshaft sensor in reciprocating engines.
 Sheet break sensing in paper machine.
 Anti-aircraft warfare
 Roller coasters
 Conveyor systems
 Beverage and food can making lines
 Mobile devices
 Touch screens that come in close proximity to the face
 Attenuating radio power in close proximity to the body, in order to reduce radiation exposure
 Automatic faucets

See also 
 Motion detector
 Occupancy sensor
 Range imaging
 Time of flight detector

References 

Position sensors